The 12th Man Again is the second album released by The Twelfth Man. Released in February 1990, it reached number one on the ARIA Charts in March 1990.

At the ARIA Music Awards of 1991, the album was nominated for ARIA Award for Best Comedy Release, losing to Great Interviews of the 20th Century by John Clarke and Bryan Dawe.

Plot
The Network Nine cricket commentary team, featuring the captain Richie Benaud, Bill Lawry, Tony Greig, Ian Chappell, Rod Marsh and Max Walker are at the MCG commentating the one-day match between Australia and Sri Lanka as part of the Benson & Hedges World Series Cup. The Sri Lankans are getting smashed in the match, Bill Lawry, an avid Victorian, loses his marbles when Merv Hughes, a fellow Victorian, claims a hat-trick and has to leave the commentary box. Merv Hughes also sticks his tongue down Allan Border's throat when the ball gets lodged in there.

Track listing 
CD (CDP 794117)
 "The 12th Man Again!" - 38:33

Charts

Weekly charts

Year-end charts

Certifications

See also
 List of number-one albums of 1990 (Australia)

References

1990 albums
Cricket on the radio
The Twelfth Man albums
1990s comedy albums